John Francis Sullivan (July 27, 1935 – September 16, 2010) was an American basketball coach and labor activist.

College career
Sullivan played on the Mount St. Mary's Mountaineers men's basketball team from 1953 to 1957. His average of 25.4 points per game is still the school record. His 2,676 points is still the school record for a career.  His 1,070 points in the 1957 season is still the school record for one season. With a 27–5 record in 1957, the Mountaineers earned a berth in the NCAA College Division Final Four.

Basketball playing career
In 1957, he was drafted as the 14th overall pick by the Philadelphia Warriors, but instead played for the Washington Tapers of the newly formed American Basketball League in 1961.

Coaching career
Sullivan coached boys' varsity basketball at Gonzaga College High School, then girls' varsity basketball at Academy of the Holy Names (Silver Spring, Maryland) from 1979 to 1987, and finally the women's basketball team at The Catholic University of America from 1989 to 1996.

Career outside basketball
After retiring from basketball in the early 1960s, Sullivan joined the Boston field office of the United States Secret Service as a special agent. According to his family, Sullivan was stationed at the Kennedy Compound when President John F. Kennedy was assassinated.

Sullivan also worked for labor unions, beginning in 1981 as director of government relations for the International Brotherhood of Teamsters. He later became a lobbyist for the Center to Protect Workers' Rights, part of Building and Construction Trades Department, AFL–CIO, until retiring in 1996.

Personal life and death
He was married to Patricia Dailey for 49 years; she survived him. They had six children.

On September 16, 2010, he died of septic shock at the University of Maryland Medical Center in Baltimore, Maryland.

Head coaching record

Notes

External links
 *Mount St. Mary’s Basketball Single Season and Career Records

1935 births
2010 deaths
American Basketball League (1961–62) players
Trade unionists from Washington, D.C.
American women's basketball coaches
Basketball players from Washington, D.C.
High school basketball coaches in the United States
Mount St. Mary's Mountaineers men's basketball players
Philadelphia Warriors draft picks
United States Secret Service agents
American men's basketball players
International Brotherhood of Teamsters people
Deaths from sepsis